George Arthur Bishop (born 1901) was a Welsh footballer.  He played professionally for Gillingham and Merthyr Town between 1926 and 1932.

References

1901 births
Year of death missing
Sportspeople from Tredegar
Welsh footballers
Gillingham F.C. players
Southampton F.C. players
Rochdale A.F.C. players
Merthyr Tydfil F.C. players
Ebbw Vale F.C. players
Association football defenders